Andover Township is one of the twenty-seven townships of Ashtabula County, Ohio, United States. The 2010 census found 2,753 people in the township, 1,608 of whom lived in the unincorporated portions of the township.

Geography
Located on the southeastern edge of the county, it borders the following townships:
Richmond Township - north
North Shenango Township, Crawford County, Pennsylvania - east
South Shenango Township, Crawford County, Pennsylvania - southeast
Williamsfield Township - south
Wayne Township - southwest corner
Cherry Valley Township - west
Dorset Township - northwest corner

The village of Andover is located in central Andover Township.

Name and history
It is the only Andover Township statewide.

Government
The township is governed by a three-member board of trustees, who are elected in November of odd-numbered years to a four-year term beginning on the following January 1. Two are elected in the year after the presidential election and one is elected in the year before it. There is also an elected township fiscal officer, who serves a four-year term beginning on April 1 of the year after the election, which is held in November of the year before the presidential election. Vacancies in the fiscal officership or on the board of trustees are filled by the remaining trustees.  Currently, the board is composed of chairman William French and members William Groff and Andrew Kirby, Fiscal Officer Karen Chapman.

References

External links
County website

Townships in Ashtabula County, Ohio
Townships in Ohio